Brühl or Bruhl may refer to:

Places

Germany
 Brühl (Rhineland), a town in North Rhine-Westphalia
 Brühl station, a railway station
 Brühl (Baden), a town in Baden-Württemberg, near Mannheim 
 Brühl (Leipzig), a street in Leipzig
 Brühl's Terrace, a historic architectural ensemble in Dresden

Poland
 Brühl Palace, Warsaw

Other uses
 Brühl (surname)
 Brühl (family)
 Brühl train disaster, 2000 in Germany
 SC Brühl, football club based in St. Gallen, Switzerland
 Stadion Brühl, football stadium at Grenchen in the Canton of Solothurn, Switzerland

See also
 Brill (disambiguation)
 Bril (disambiguation)